Günter Brümmer (15 February 1933 – 1 January 2020) was a West German slalom canoeist who competed from the mid-1950s to the mid-1960s. He won a silver medal in the C-2 team event at the 1963 ICF Canoe Slalom World Championships in Spittal.

References

1933 births
2020 deaths
German male canoeists
Medalists at the ICF Canoe Slalom World Championships
Recipients of the Cross of the Order of Merit of the Federal Republic of Germany